Esthella Provas is a Mexican art dealer who co-founded Chac Mool Gallery with Eugenio López Alonso in Los Angeles, California, which was a fixture in the Southern California art scene until its closing in 2006.

Career 
Provas is well reputed as an art adviser and has been fundamental in the building of careers of notable artists including John Baldessari and Mary Corse. She also is responsible for guiding the acquisitions of the Colección Jumex with artists including Gabriel Orozco, Mariana Castillo Deball, Jose Dávila, Pia Camil, Richard Serra, Julie Mehretu, Lucio Fontana, and Ellsworth Kelly. Provas has also curated exhibitions with artists Micol Hebron and Jorge Méndez Blake.

References 

American art dealers
American art curators
Mexican art collectors